Haldighati Passenger is a passenger train of Indian Railways, which runs between Agra Fort railway station of Agra of  Indian state Uttar Pradesh and Ratlam Junction railway station of Ratlam, Madhya Pradesh covering whole  Haldighati region.

Arrival and departure
Train no. 59811 departs from Ratlam daily at 08:35 hrs. reaches Agra Fort, the same day at 06:00 hrs. 
Train no. 59812 departs from Agra Fort, daily at 18:45 hrs., reaching Ratlam the same day at 15:35.

Route and halts
The train goes via Kota Junction. The important halts of the train are:

 Ratlam Junction
 Namli
 Brayla Chaurasi
 Jaora
 Dhodhar
 Kachnara Road
 Dalauda
 Mandsor
 Piplia
 Malhargarh
 Harkia Khal
 Nimach railway station
 Bisalwas Kalan
 Jawad Road
 Nimbahera
 Gambhiri Road
 Shambhupura
 Chittaurgarh Junction
 Chanderiya
 Parsoli
 Mandalgarh
 Shampura
 Upramal
 Jalindri
 Srinagar Rajasthan
 Bundi
 Kota Junction
 Gurla
 Keshorai Patan
 Arnetha
 Kapren
 Ghataka Varana
 Laban 
 Lakheri
 Indargarh Sumerganj Mandi
 Amli
 Rawania Dungar
 Kushtala
 Sawai Madhopur Junction
 Ranthambhore
 Mokholi
 Malarna
 Nomoda
 Narayanpur Tatwara
 Lalpur Umri
 Gangapur City
 Chhoti Odai
 Pilioda
 Khandip
 Shri Mahabirji
 Hindaun City
 Fateh Singhpura
 Dumariya
 Bayana Junction
 Birambad
 Bandh Bareta
 Naglatula
 Bansi Paharpur
 Dhana Kherli
 Rupbas
 Aulenda
 Fatehpur Sikri
 Singarpur
 Kiraoli
 Mirhakur
 Pathauli
 Idgah Junction
 Agra Fort

Coach composite
The train consists of 18 coaches:
 1 First Class
 3 Sleeper coaches
 8 Unreserved
 1 Ladies/Handicapped
 2 Luggage/Brake van

Average speed and frequency

The train runs with an average speed of 35 km/h. The train runs on a daily basis.

Loco link
The train is hauled by Ratlam WDM-3 Diesel engine till Kota then with Kota to Agra Fort:- WAM 4E Vadodara (BRC) shed.

Rake maintenance & sharing

The train is maintained by the Ratlam Coaching Depot. The same rake is used for Kota Agra Yamuna Bridge Passenger, one way which is altered by the second rake on the other way.

References

Rail transport in Madhya Pradesh
Rail transport in Rajasthan
Slow and fast passenger trains in India
Trains from Agra
Transport in Ratlam